USS Coconino County (LST-603), originally USS LST-603, was a United States Navy  built for the United States Navy during World War II and in commission from 1944 to 1955 and from 1966 to 1969. Named after Coconino County, Arizona, she was the only U.S. Navy vessel to bear the name.

Construction and commission
LST-603 was laid down on 5 November 1943 at Seneca, Illinois, by the Chicago Bridge and Iron Company. Her Ship naming and launching was on 14 March 1944, sponsored by Mrs. Etla N. Hobart, and commissioned on 5 April 1944.

First period in commission, 1944–1955
During World War II, LST-603 was assigned to the European Theater of Operations. She participated in Operation Dragoon, the invasion of southern France, in August and September 1944.

Following the war, she served in the Amphibious Force, United States Atlantic Fleet, including one deployment to the Mediterranean in 1950. She was decommissioned on 12 May 1955. On 1 July 1955, while out of commission, she was renamed USS Coconino County (LST-603).

Second period in commission, 1966–1969
Coconino County was recommissioned on 8 June 1966 for Vietnam War service, and operated in the Vietnam theater from 1966 until she was transferred to the Republic of Vietnam Navy on 4 April 1969.

South Vietnamese service
In South Vietnamese service, she served as RVNS "Vung Tau" (HQ-503). South Vietnam collapsed in April 1975, where she was taken over by the Vietnam People's Navy and continues to be used as a training vessel.

Capture by the Democratic Republic of Vietnam
Captured by the North Vietnamese around the time of the fall of Saigon, the ship was placed in service with the Vietnamese People's Navy

Awards and honors
LST-603 received one battle star for World War II service, and Coconino County received six campaign stars and two awards of the Meritorious Unit Commendation for Vietnam War service.

See also
 List of United States Navy LSTs

References

 
 

LST-542-class tank landing ships
World War II amphibious warfare vessels of the United States
Cold War amphibious warfare vessels of the United States
Vietnam War amphibious warfare vessels of the United States
Ships of the Vietnam People's Navy
Coconino County, Arizona
Ships built in Seneca, Illinois
1944 ships
Ships transferred from the United States Navy to the Republic of Vietnam Navy